The 2010–11 Georgia Bulldogs men's basketball team represented the University of Georgia during the college basketball season of 2010–2011. The team's head coach was Mark Fox, in his second season at UGA. They played their home games at Stegeman Coliseum and are members of the Southeastern Conference. They finished the season 21–12, 9–7 in SEC play and lost in the quarterfinals of the 2011 SEC men's basketball tournament to Alabama. They received an at large bid in the 2011 NCAA Division I men's basketball tournament where they lost in the second round to Washington.

Roster

Class of 2011 Commitments

Schedule

|-
!colspan=9| Exhibition

|-
!colspan=9| Regular season

|-
!colspan=9| 2011 SEC tournament

|-
!colspan=9| 2011 NCAA tournament

Rankings

When the Bulldogs were ranked 24th in the AP Poll in January 2011, it was the first time that the team had been nationally ranked since the 2002–03 season.

References

Georgia Bulldogs basketball seasons
Georgia Bulldogs
Georgia Bulldogs
Bulldogs
Bulldogs